Feakle (historically Feakell and Fiakil, from ) is a village in County Clare, Ireland, in the Roman Catholic parish of the same name.

Location
"Paroiste na fiacaile" means parish of the tooth. A legend says that the tooth of Mochonna, the patron saint, fell out in this place, where he built his church.
Other theories are that the place is named after a church that was roofed with "fiathgail", a rough local grass, or that the name comes from "Fia-Choill", the wood of the deer.

An 1845 description said "the surface consists of the loftiest, wildest, and most northerly of the western uplands of the county; and includes the southern declivities of the Slieve-Baghta mountains, and those offshoot ranges and masses which embosom Lough Graney, and stretch toward Lough O’Grady. The highest ground is on the west, and has an altitude of 1,312 feet."

The parish of Feakle is in the Roman Catholic Diocese of Killaloe. Parish churches are St Joseph's in Kilclaren and St Mary's in Feakle.
The village population in 2006 was 122. It neighbours Lough Derg and the towns of Tulla and Scarriff. Feakle is famous for its traditional music festival.

History
St. Mochonna is venerated as the patron saint of Feakle. The ancient ruins of his church were destroyed in the early 19th century. 

Under the religious persecution of the Catholic Church in Ireland imposed by the Penal Laws, the Catholics of Feakle would travel in secret to a Mass rock located at one of the many Megalithic tombs in the nearby Ballycroum bog.

On 12 December 1974 Irish Republican Army and Sinn Féin leaders met at Smith's Hotel, Feakle, with the leaders of the main Irish Protestant Christian denominations (Church of Ireland, Methodist, and Presbyterian) to discuss ways of resolving the Northern Ireland crisis. The Gardaí (Irish police) broke up the meeting. Although any wanted IRA men had already departed, the churchmen did pass on the list of Republican demands to the British government. Methodist leader Eric Gallagher was in attendance and later became the subject of the book Peacemaker by author Dennis Cooke.

People
Herbalist Biddy Early (1798 - 1874). Famous as a healer and accused, under an antiquated law, in 1865 of witchcraft, Biddy was well known in the area. Local folklore says that if you leave a coin at her house you will have good health, but take a coin and you will have bad luck.
Brian Merriman, a local Bard, fiddler, and hedge schoolmaster, is associated with the area. Although neither born, nor did he die, in Feakle, he chose to be buried here where he had spent most of his life. Feakle is also where he composed one of the greatest works of Modern literature in Irish, a lengthy work of comic poetry in Munster Irish, entitled Cúirt an Mheán Oíche (The Midnight Court). In the poem, the women of Ireland sue the men for refusing to marry and father children, before the judgement seat of Aoibheall, a member of the Tuatha De Danaan who, since Saint Patrick, has been demoted from goddess to being the local fairy queen. A monument to Merriman's memory has been erected by An Cumman Merriman (the Merriman Society) and may be seen in the local graveyard.
Dan Minogue (1893–1983), Australian federal politician
Johnny Patterson (1840-1889) singer and composer was born in Kilbarron near Feakle
Ger Loughnane, former Clare hurler and manager of Galway hurling team (b.1953).
Martin Hayes, b. 1962, world-famous fiddler, was born in Feakle.

See also
 List of towns and villages in Ireland

References

External links
Clare places - Feakle
Feakle Festival 

Towns and villages in County Clare
Civil parishes of County Clare
Parishes of the Roman Catholic Diocese of Killaloe